Cynthia Wolken is a Democratic politician who served as member of the Montana Senate before becoming deputy director of the Montana Department of Corrections.  She was first elected to Senate District 48 on November 4, 2014, representing part of Missoula, Montana.

She was named deputy director of the Montana Department of Corrections in January 2018. Her resignation from the state senate took effect on February 16, 2018. Nate McConnell was named as her replacement.

References

Living people
Democratic Party Montana state senators
Year of birth missing (living people)
Politicians from Missoula, Montana
Place of birth missing (living people)
21st-century American politicians